St. Charles West High School is a public high school in St. Charles, Missouri that is part of the City of St. Charles School District.

Activities
For the 2011–2012 school year, the school offered 21 activities approved by the Missouri State High School Activities Association (MSHSAA): baseball, boys and girls basketball, cheerleading, boys and girls cross country, dance team, football, boys golf, music activities, boys and girls soccer, softball, speech and debate, girls swimming and diving, boys tennis, boys and girls track and field, girls volleyball, winter guard, and wrestling.

Notable alumni
Wendy Dillinger: Women's soccer coach at University of Missouri - St. Louis
Tim Hawkins: Comedian and Entertainer 
Ryan Robertson: Former NBA player

References

External links
City of St. Charles School District

High schools in St. Charles County, Missouri
Public high schools in Missouri